Nick Gillekens (born 5 July 1995) is a Belgian professional footballer who plays as a goalkeeper for Belgian First Division A club Westerlo.

Career
Gillekens made his debut for OH Leuven in the 2014–15 Belgian Cup in the sixth round match against Kortrijk, a 1-3 loss, although that season he was part of the reserves and only fourth goalkeeper behind Logan Bailly, Yves Lenaerts and Senne Vits. Later that season he also played one match in the 2014–15 Belgian Second Division against Mons. Although Gillekens was promoted to third keeper for the 2015–16 season, he did not play a single match that season. Following the relegation from the 2015–16 Belgian Pro League, first goalkeeper Rudy Riou was released while second goalkeeper Yves Lenaerts had already signed for ASV Geel. As such, Gillekens was promoted to first goalkeeper for the 2016–17 season in the Belgian First Division B. During the winter 2017–18 transfer window OH Leuven signed Kawin Thamsatchanan, captain of the Thailand national football team and soon thereafter Gillekens was demoted to reserve goalkeeper. Following Thamsatchanan's injury during the 2018–19 season, Gillekens again became first goalkeeper for a few matches before then being surpassed by Laurent Henkinet. Towards the end of the season, Gillekens was even demoted to third goalkeeper with Thamsatchanan now taking his place on the bench and after the final match of the season it became clear that Gillekens would not be signing a new deal at OH Leuven.

After being a free agent player for a few months, Gillekens was signed by Mouscron in the beginning of November 2019, as their first goalkeeper Jean Butez had suffered a long term injury.

Personal 
Gillekens' younger brother Jordy Gillekens also plays for OH Leuven.

References

External links

1995 births
Living people
Belgian footballers
Association football goalkeepers
Oud-Heverlee Leuven players
Royal Excel Mouscron players
K.V.C. Westerlo players
Belgian Pro League players
Challenger Pro League players